Bellina may refer to:

 Given name
 Meriam Bellina (born 1965), an Indonesian actress who acted in more than 50 films

 Bellina Logan, an American television and film actress

 Other uses
 Bellina, a genus of bristle flies belonging to the family Tachinidae
 Iolaus bellina, a butterfly of the family Lycaenidae, also known as the white-spot sapphire
 Phalaenopsis bellina, a species of orchid endemic of Borneo